Robotino is a mobile robot system made by Festo Didactic, and used for educational, training and research purposes.

Operation
Robotino is based on an omnidirectional drive assembly, which enables the system to roam freely. The robot is controlled by an industry-standard PC system, which is powerful enough to plan routes for fully autonomous driving. Via a WLAN-Link, Robotino can send all sensor readings to an external PC. In the other direction, control commands can be issued by the external PC. This way, control programs can run on the external PC or on Robotino directly. Mixed mode or shared control are also possible.
 
For users with little prior robotics knowledge, Robotino can be readily programmed in its “native” programming environment RobotinoView II. More experienced programmers may find it useful that the robot can also be programmed in C, C++, Java, .NET, Matlab, Simulink, Labview and Microsoft Robotics Developer Studio.

Hardware
The omnidirectional drive consists of three Mecanum wheels, all of which are individually controllable. These wheels are arranged at angles of 120°. Robotino has a bumper sensor around its circumference, infrared distance sensors, a color camera with VGA resolution, optical wheel encoders, power measurement for the entire system and the various motors, as well as a battery voltage monitor. Moreover, as optional additional sensors, Robotino can be equipped with a precise laser scanner, a gyroscope, and an indoor positioning system (created by Evolution Robotics). For signal input and output Robotino has several interfaces:
 USB 
 Ethernet 
 8 digital and 8 analog inputs 
 8 digital outputs 
 additional motor output for driving high loads
 additional encoder input

Power is supplied by two 12V/5Ah lead-acid batteries or optionally by two 12V/9Ah NiMH batteries.

External links 

 Robotino at Festo Didactic
 Robotino wiki
 Robotino forum

Educational robots
Three-wheeled robots
Robots of Germany
21st-century robots